Ampelosicyos is a genus of flowering plants belonging to the family Cucurbitaceae.

It is native to Madagascar.

The genus name of Ampelosicyos is in honour of Ampelos, who was the personification of the grapevine and lover of Dionysus in Greek and Roman mythology.  
It was first described and published in Hist. Vég. Îsles Austral. Afriq. on page 68 in 1808.

Species known
As accepted by Plants of the World Online:
Ampelosicyos bosseri 
Ampelosicyos humblotii 
Ampelosicyos leandrii 
Ampelosicyos major 
Ampelosicyos meridionalis 
Ampelosicyos scandens

References

Cucurbitaceae
Cucurbitaceae genera
Plants described in 1808
Endemic flora of Madagascar